William Thompson Peters (May 30, 1805 – July 24, 1885) was an American politician.

Peters, son of the Hon. John T. Peters, for many years a judge of the Supreme Court of Connecticut, and Elizabeth (Caulking) Peters, was born in Hebron, Conn., May 30, 1805, and entered Yale College from Hartford, then his father's residence.  He graduated from Yale in 1825.

On December 7, 1826, he married Etha L. Town, daughter of Ithiel Town, the well-known architect of New Haven. He remained in New Haven, pursuing medical studies with Dr. William Tully, and received the degree of M.D. from the college in 1830.  Soon after this he founded the drug-store in New Haven, long known as Apothecaries' Hall. In 1851, owing to ill health, he removed to Cheshire, Conn, where he engaged in farming, though also prominent in political affairs. He was elected a member of the Connecticut State Senate in 1857, and represented the town of Cheshire in the Connecticut General Assembly in 1861 and 1873. He also filled many local offices of trust and honor, such as town clerk, treasurer, and judge of probate; and was a collector of internal revenue under President Abraham Lincoln.

He removed in 1881 to the residence of his youngest son, in Waterbury, Conn., where he died on July 24, 1885, in his 81st year. Two children survived him: his eldest child graduated Yale in 1849, and died in 1856.

1805 births
1885 deaths
People from Hebron, Connecticut
Yale School of Medicine alumni
Connecticut state senators
Members of the Connecticut House of Representatives
Connecticut local politicians
19th-century American politicians
Yale College alumni